In neutron time-of-flight scattering, a form of inelastic neutron scattering, the initial position and velocity of a pulse of neutrons is fixed, and their final position and the time after the pulse that the neutrons are detected are measured. By the principle of conservation of momentum, these pairs of coordinates may be transformed into momenta and energies for the neutrons, and the experimentalist may use this information to calculate the momentum and energy transferred to the sample.  Inverse geometry spectrometers are also possible. In this case, the final position and velocity are fixed, and the incident coordinates varied.

Time-of-flight scattering can be performed at either a research reactor or a spallation source.

Time-of-flight spectrometers at pulsed sources
Time-of-flight spectrometers at pulsed sources include Pharos at LANSCE's Lujan Center at Los Alamos National Laboratory, MAPS, MARI, HET, MERLIN and LET at the ISIS neutron source, and
ARCS, CNCS, and SEQUOIA at the Spallation Neutron Source, iBIX, SuperHRPD, PLANET, SENJU, TAKUMI, iMATERIA and NOVA at the J-PARC and SKAT-EPSILON, DIN-2PI, NERA at the IBR-2 pulsed reactor.

Time-of-flight spectrometers at continuous sources
Time-of-flight spectrometers at continuous sources include DCS and FCS at the NIST laboratories in Maryland,
IN4, IN5, and IN6 at the Institut Laue-Langevin,
TOFTOF at the Forschungsneutronenquelle Heinz Maier-Leibnitz,
PELICAN at the Australian Nuclear Science and Technology Organisation,
FOCUS at the Paul Scherrer Institute.

Related projects
Integrated Infrastructure Initiative for Neutron Scattering and Muon Spectroscopy (NMI3) is a European consortium of 18 partner organisations from 12 countries, including all major facilities in the fields of neutron scattering and muon spectroscopy

References

Neutron scattering